The 2nd constituency of the Ardennes is a French legislative constituency in the Ardennes département.  It is currently represented by centre-right politician Pierre Cordier.

Description

It is located in the northern corner of the Department at the Belgian border, and cuts the town of Charleville-Mézières in two, along with the Ardennes' 1st constituency.

Deputies

Election results

2022

 
 
 
 
 
 
|-
| colspan="8" bgcolor="#E9E9E9"|
|-

2017

2012

|- style="background-color:#E9E9E9;text-align:center;"
! colspan="2" rowspan="2" style="text-align:left;" | Candidate
! rowspan="2" colspan="2" style="text-align:left;" | Party
! colspan="2" | 1st round
! colspan="2" | 2nd round
|- style="background-color:#E9E9E9;text-align:center;"
! width="75" | Votes
! width="30" | %
! width="75" | Votes
! width="30" | %
|-
| style="background-color:" |
| style="text-align:left;" | Christophe Leonard
| style="text-align:left;" | Socialist Party
| PS
| 
| 30.41%
| 
| 53.63%
|-
| style="background-color:" |
| style="text-align:left;" | Boris Ravignon
| style="text-align:left;" | Union for a Popular Movement
| UMP
| 
| 29.80%
| 
| 46.37%
|-
| style="background-color:" |
| style="text-align:left;" | Benoît Girand
| style="text-align:left;" | National Front
| FN
| 
| 16.20%
| colspan="2" style="text-align:left;" |
|-
| style="background-color:" |
| style="text-align:left;" | Philippe Vuilque
| style="text-align:left;" | Miscellaneous Left
| DVG
| 
| 13.56%
| colspan="2" style="text-align:left;" |
|-
| style="background-color:" |
| style="text-align:left;" | Michèle Leflon
| style="text-align:left;" | Left Front
| FG
| 
| 5.50%
| colspan="2" style="text-align:left;" |
|-
| style="background-color:" |
| style="text-align:left;" | Sylvain Baumel
| style="text-align:left;" | The Greens
| VEC
| 
| 2.05%
| colspan="2" style="text-align:left;" |
|-
| style="background-color:" |
| style="text-align:left;" | Alain Sutter
| style="text-align:left;" | New Centre-Presidential Majority
| NCE
| 
| 1.08%
| colspan="2" style="text-align:left;" |
|-
| style="background-color:" |
| style="text-align:left;" | Mink Takawe
| style="text-align:left;" | Far Left
| EXG
| 
| 0.50%
| colspan="2" style="text-align:left;" |
|-
| style="background-color:" |
| style="text-align:left;" | Jean Pierrard
| style="text-align:left;" | Ecologist
| ECO
| 
| 0.45%
| colspan="2" style="text-align:left;" |
|-
| style="background-color:" |
| style="text-align:left;" | Claire Combis
| style="text-align:left;" | Radical Party
| PRV
| 
| 0.44%
| colspan="2" style="text-align:left;" |
|-
| colspan="8" style="background-color:#E9E9E9;"|
|- style="font-weight:bold"
| colspan="4" style="text-align:left;" | Total
| 
| 100%
| 
| 100%
|-
| colspan="8" style="background-color:#E9E9E9;"|
|-
| colspan="4" style="text-align:left;" | Registered voters
| 
| style="background-color:#E9E9E9;"|
| 
| style="background-color:#E9E9E9;"|
|-
| colspan="4" style="text-align:left;" | Blank/Void ballots
| 
| 1.25%
| 
| 2.89%
|-
| colspan="4" style="text-align:left;" | Turnout
| 
| 54.39%
| 
| 54.47%
|-
| colspan="4" style="text-align:left;" | Abstentions
| 
| 45.61%
| 
| 45.53%
|-
| colspan="8" style="background-color:#E9E9E9;"|
|- style="font-weight:bold"
| colspan="6" style="text-align:left;" | Result
| colspan="2" style="background-color:" | PS HOLD
|}

2007

|- style="background-color:#E9E9E9;text-align:center;"
! colspan="2" rowspan="2" style="text-align:left;" | Candidate
! rowspan="2" colspan="2" style="text-align:left;" | Party
! colspan="2" | 1st round
! colspan="2" | 2nd round
|- style="background-color:#E9E9E9;text-align:center;"
! width="75" | Votes
! width="30" | %
! width="75" | Votes
! width="30" | %
|-
| style="background-color:" |
| style="text-align:left;" | Philippe Vuilque
| style="text-align:left;" | Socialist Party
| PS
| 
| 37.33%
| 
| 51.48%
|-
| style="background-color:" |
| style="text-align:left;" | Boris Ravignon
| style="text-align:left;" | Union for a Popular Movement
| UMP
| 
| 40.35%
| 
| 48.52%
|-
| style="background-color:" |
| style="text-align:left;" | Florence Richard
| style="text-align:left;" | Democratic Movement
| MoDem
| 
| 5.73%
| colspan="2" style="text-align:left;" |
|-
| style="background-color:" |
| style="text-align:left;" | Roland Bataille
| style="text-align:left;" | National Front
| FN
| 
| 5.40%
| colspan="2" style="text-align:left;" |
|-
| style="background-color:" |
| style="text-align:left;" | Michèle Leflon
| style="text-align:left;" | Communist
| COM
| 
| 3.58%
| colspan="2" style="text-align:left;" |
|-
| style="background-color:" |
| style="text-align:left;" | Jean-Michel Fournaise
| style="text-align:left;" | Far Left
| EXG
| 
| 1.77%
| colspan="2" style="text-align:left;" |
|-
| style="background-color:" |
| style="text-align:left;" | Mezhoura Nait-Abdelaziz
| style="text-align:left;" | The Greens
| VEC
| 
| 1.51%
| colspan="2" style="text-align:left;" |
|-
| style="background-color:" |
| style="text-align:left;" | Gérard Baudoin
| style="text-align:left;" | Far Left
| EXG
| 
| 1.13%
| colspan="2" style="text-align:left;" |
|-
| style="background-color:" |
| style="text-align:left;" | Josée Tilquin
| style="text-align:left;" | Movement for France
| MPF
| 
| 1.03%
| colspan="2" style="text-align:left;" |
|-
| style="background-color:" |
| style="text-align:left;" | Joël Nouet
| style="text-align:left;" | Far Left
| EXG
| 
| 0.81%
| colspan="2" style="text-align:left;" |
|-
| style="background-color:" |
| style="text-align:left;" | Jean-Pierre Jadon
| style="text-align:left;" | Far Right
| EXD
| 
| 0.70%
| colspan="2" style="text-align:left;" |
|-
| style="background-color:" |
| style="text-align:left;" | Abderzake Chaouchi
| style="text-align:left;" | Divers
| DIV
| 
| 0.66%
| colspan="2" style="text-align:left;" |
|-
| colspan="8" style="background-color:#E9E9E9;"|
|- style="font-weight:bold"
| colspan="4" style="text-align:left;" | Total
| 
| 100%
| 
| 100%
|-
| colspan="8" style="background-color:#E9E9E9;"|
|-
| colspan="4" style="text-align:left;" | Registered voters
| 
| style="background-color:#E9E9E9;"|
| 
| style="background-color:#E9E9E9;"|
|-
| colspan="4" style="text-align:left;" | Blank/Void ballots
| 
| 1.42%
| 
| 2.12%
|-
| colspan="4" style="text-align:left;" | Turnout
| 
| 56.50%
| 
| 61.01%
|-
| colspan="4" style="text-align:left;" | Abstentions
| 
| 43.50%
| 
| 38.99%
|-
| colspan="8" style="background-color:#E9E9E9;"|
|- style="font-weight:bold"
| colspan="6" style="text-align:left;" | Result
| colspan="2" style="background-color:" | PS HOLD
|}

2002

 
 
 
 
 
 
 
|-
| colspan="8" bgcolor="#E9E9E9"|
|-

1997

 
 
 
 
 
 
 
|-
| colspan="8" bgcolor="#E9E9E9"|
|-

Sources

 French Interior Ministry results website: 

2